South Suffolk is a constituency represented in the House of Commons of the UK Parliament since 2015 by James Cartlidge, a Conservative.

History 
South Suffolk is one of seven constituencies in the county of Suffolk and was created by boundary changes which came into force for the 1983 general election. It was formed primarily from areas to the west of Ipswich and the River Orwell, including the towns of Sudbury and Hadleigh, which had formed the majority of the abolished constituency of Sudbury and Woodbridge. Extended westwards to include Haverhill and surrounding areas, transferred from Bury St Edmunds.

Between 1559 and 1844, the constituency of Sudbury represented the town on the southwestern border with Essex, but this constituency was disenfranchised for corruption in 1844.

In every election, the Conservative candidate has been elected or re-elected; until 2015, said candidate was Tim Yeo, who was deselected prior to the 2015 general election; he was succeeded as Conservative candidate, and subsequently MP, by James Cartlidge.

Constituency profile 
South Suffolk is a large and predominantly rural seat, sharing a long border with the county of Essex but retaining a rather different identity and character - distinctly East Anglian rather than Home Counties.

The largest settlements, Sudbury and Hadleigh, are small, quiet towns, somewhat off the beaten track, and the only other significantly built-up area in the seat is the suburb of Pinewood, just outside the limits of Ipswich, where there are many new developments. There is still some industry in Brantham, close to the Essex border, but most of the seat is traditional agriculture, sitting alongside remote commuter bases for those working in London, Ipswich, Colchester or Chelmsford.

In common with many seats of this type, it is fairly safe for the Conservatives, with the opponents being significantly lower in terms of the vote share.

Workless claimants were in November 2012 significantly lower than the national average of 3.8%, at 2.5% of the population based on a statistical compilation by The Guardian.

Boundaries and boundary changes 

1983–1997: The District of Babergh, and the Borough of St Edmundsbury wards of Cangle, Castle, Cavendish, Chalkstone, Clare, Clements, Hundon, Kedington, St Mary's and Helions, Wickhambrook, and Withersfield.

1997–present: The District of Babergh, and the Borough of St Edmundsbury wards of Cavendish, and Clare.

All but two of the Borough of St Edmundsbury wards, including Haverhill were transferred to the new county constituency of West Suffolk.

Members of Parliament

Elections

Elections in the 2010s

Elections in the 2000s

Elections in the 1990s

Elections in the 1980s

See also 
 List of parliamentary constituencies in Suffolk

Notes

References

Parliamentary constituencies in Suffolk
Constituencies of the Parliament of the United Kingdom established in 1983
Babergh District